Keerikkad (Village) is a village in Alappuzha district in the Indian state of Kerala.

Demographics
, Keerikkad (Village) had a population of 10003 with 4662 males and 5341 females.

References

Villages in Alappuzha district